Jocquella is a genus of Papuan long-legged cave spiders that was first described by L. Baert in 1980.  it contains two species, found in Papua New Guinea: J. boisai and J. leopoldi.

See also
 List of Telemidae species

References

Araneomorphae genera
Spiders of Asia
Telemidae